London Playhouse is a UK television anthology series that aired from 1955–56.  There were a total of twenty-five episodes.  Among its writing credits include Tad Mosel, N. Richard Nash, Henry James, Robert Lowell, and Robert Alan Aurthur.  Guest stars included Edward Mulhare, Sylvia Syms, Stephen Boyd, and Lionel Jeffries. Only seven of the episodes are known to still exist, nevertheless this is a higher survival rate than many other UK series of the mid-1950s.

References

External links

British drama television series
1955 British television series debuts
1956 British television series endings
1950s British anthology television series
1950s British drama television series
English-language television shows
Black-and-white British television shows